Jo Soo-min (born March 5, 1999) is a South Korean actress.

Filmography

Film

Television series

Web series

Television shows

Awards and nominations

References

External links
 
 
 

1997 births
Living people
South Korean child actresses
South Korean television actresses
South Korean film actresses